Schoenobiodes lanceolata is a moth in the family Crambidae. It was described by Roepke in 1943. It is found on Java.

References

Crambinae
Moths described in 1943